Dariusz Stola  (born 11 December 1963 in Warsaw, Poland) is a professor of history at the Institute of Political Studies of the Polish Academy of Sciences.

Career
Stola teaches modern history and studies 20th-century human migrations, the Holocaust, Polish-Jewish relations, and the history of postwar Poland's communist regime. From 2014 to 2019 he was director of the POLIN Museum of the History of Polish Jews. He is the author or co-author of seven books and over one hundred scholarly papers.

Awards
Stola is a two-time recipient of the Polityka magazine award, and a recipient of the award of the Edward Raczyński Polish Foundation in London, England.

Selected works
Kraj bez wyjścia? Migracje z Polski 1949-1989 (A Country with No Way Out?  Migrations from Poland, 1949–1989), Warsaw, Institute of National Remembrance, 2010.  Polityka Award for Best Historical Book of 2010.
Historia (History). Textbook for secondary-school classes 2 (with J. Czubaty) and 3, Warsaw, 2009
Co-author, Od Piłsudskiego do Wałęsy. Studia z dziejów Polski w XX wieku (From Piłsudski to Wałęsa:  Studies in 20th-Century Polish History), Warsaw, 2008 
Złote lata PZPR: finanse partii w dekadzie Gierka (Golden Years of the Polish People's Republic:  The Party's Finances during Gierek's Decade), Warsaw, 2008
Co-author, PRL. Trwanie i zmiana (The Polish People's Republic:  Endurance and Change), Warsaw, 2003 
Co-author, Patterns of Migration in Central Europe, New York, 2001 
Kampania antysyjonistyczna w Polsce 1967-1968 (The Anti-Zionist Campaign in Poland, 1967–1968), Warsaw, 2000
Nadzieja i zagłada. Ignacy Schwarzbart – żydowski przedstawiciel w Radzie Narodowej RP, 1940-1945 (Hope and Destruction:  Ignacy Schwarzbart, Jewish Representative in the Polish National Council, 1940–1945), Warsaw, 1995

See also
 List of Poles

References

Historians of Poland
20th-century Polish historians
Polish male non-fiction writers
1963 births
Living people
Writers from Warsaw
University of Warsaw alumni
Academic staff of the University of Warsaw
Directors of museums in Poland
Recipients of the Order of Polonia Restituta
Recipients of the Order of the Lion of Finland
21st-century Polish historians
Recipient of the Meritorious Activist of Culture badge